Preseglie is a comune in the province of Brescia, in Lombardy.

References 

Cities and towns in Lombardy